The Barrington Griffiths Watch Company, based in Calgary, Alberta, Canada, is a designer and manufacturer of limited edition wristwatches using recycled Swiss movements. The design of their Modern Classic watch was inspired by the 1940s mechanical movement used in its construction. The Barrington Griffiths Watch Company is one of only a few companies making wristwatches in Canada. Although they use movements of Swiss origin, the components of the case are made in Canada, and the watch itself is assembled in Canada, satisfying the Canadian Competition Bureau's requirements for a "Made in Canada" product.

Company history
Barrington Griffiths was founded in 2010 by Industrial Designer Mark Griffiths to create a Canadian watch line. The name "Barrington Griffiths" is the full family name of the founder. The company logo is the abbreviation "BG".

The Modern Classic
The Modern Classic watch uses a refurbished mechanical movement made by Swiss manufacturer ETA, for Bulova pocket watches of the 1940s and 50s. The idea to convert a pocket watch to a wristwatch is not new. As far back as the 19th century soldiers requiring precision watches during battle made the first conversions in order to free up their hands. These early conversions eventually came to be known as "trench watches" because of their extensive use among soldiers in the trenches during World War I. Today few companies do such conversions because of the cost and effort required.

References

External links
 Official Website

Manufacturing companies of Canada
Companies based in Calgary
Canadian companies established in 2010